Patrick McGilligan (1847–1917) was an Irish nationalist politician. He was MP for South Fermanagh from 1892 until 1895. McGilligan was a Coleraine businessman who was on the Irish National Federation, the anti-Parnell side of the Irish Parliamentary Party, after the split in 1890.

McGilligan had twelve children, one son also called Patrick served as a TD and cabinet minister in Dáil Éireann.

References

Sources
 
The First British Commonwealth: Essays in Honour of Nicholas Mansergh, London, Frank Cass and Company Limited, 1980, page 118.

1847 births
1917 deaths
Irish Parliamentary Party MPs
Anti-Parnellite MPs
Members of the Parliament of the United Kingdom for County Fermanagh constituencies (1801–1922)
UK MPs 1892–1895
Politicians from County Londonderry